Set Sail is The Movement's second studio album, produced by Chris DiBeneditto at Philadelphonic Studios in Philadelphia, Pennsylvania and released on October 25, 2008. This album features artists such as Garrett "G. Love" Dutton and Mark Boyce of G. Love & Special Sauce, Chuck Treece, and Oguer Ocon of Slightly Stoopid.

Track listing
All tracks by Jordan Miller and Josh Swain except where noted.

"Say Hello" – 3:13
"Mexico" – 4:12
"Set Sail" – 3:36
"Impressions" – 3:56
"Green Girl" – 3:45
"Habit" – 4:11
"Cool-Aid" – 4:21
"Ocho Rios" – 3:25
"Alright" – 3:04
"Sweet Summertime" – 3:37
"Throwdown" – 3:39
"Another Man's Shoes" (feat. G. Love) (Garrett Dutton, Miller, Swain) – 3:34
"Scream" – 3:57
"Kind" – 3:34 (hidden track "Breathe" – 4:56)

Personnel
Mark Boyce – keyboards
Chris DiBeneditto – producer, engineer, mixing, tracking
Garrett "G. Love" Dutton – vocals, harmonica
Jordan Miller – guitar, vocals
Oguer Ocon – percussion
Jon Ruff – turntables
Josh Swain – bass guitar, guitar, vocals
Chuck Treece – drums

See also
 List of albums containing a hidden track

References

External links
 The Movement's Official Website
 The Pier's review of Set Sail
 The Pier's interview with Josh Swain and Jordan Miller

2008 albums
The Movement (reggae band) albums